Acidaliastis micra is a moth of the family Geometridae first described by George Hampson in 1896. It is found in Sri Lanka. African countries of Chad, Algeria, Djibouti, Egypt, Ethiopia, Kenya, Niger, Sudan, Somalia towards Middle East countries of Saudi Arabia, Yemen and Oman.

Three subspecies recognized including the nominate race.
Acidaliastis micra dissimilis Warren, 1905
Acidaliastis micra galactea Rungs, 1943
Acidaliastis micra micra Hampson, 1896

References

Moths of Asia
Moths described in 1896